The Royal Magazine was a monthly British literary magazine that was published between 1898 and 1939. Its founder and publisher was Sir Arthur Pearson.

The Royal Magazines first edition was published in November 1898. According to this issue, one million copies of the first edition of the magazine were ordered. Editors of the magazine included Percy Everett (1901–1911).

Throughout the 1930s, as the magazine struggled to regain its relevance, it changed names a number of times. With the December 1930 issue, the magazine re-christened itself The New Royal Magazine. Beginning in June 1932, it became The Royal Pictorial. Beginning in January 1935, it was The Royal Screen Pictorial, and in June 1935, the word "Royal" was dropped entirely as it became The Screen Pictorial'''''. The magazine's final issue was in September 1939, the month in which the Second World War began in Europe. In total, 491 issues were published.

The magazine was the initial publisher of a number of the works of fiction by Agatha Christie. "The Tuesday Night Club", which appeared in the December 1927 issue, was the first published appearance of Christie's character Miss Marple.

External links
"The Royal Magazine" : Magazine Data File

References

Defunct literary magazines published in the United Kingdom
Magazines established in 1898
Magazines disestablished in 1939
Monthly magazines published in the United Kingdom
Magazines published in London